The Getty Center Tram is a  people mover system that serves the Getty Center in Los Angeles. It runs two cable-driven hovertrains each consisting of three Otis Hovair vehicles.

History 
The tram line, already planned in 1988, was opened at the end of 1997, following the inauguration of the Getty Center.

Route 
The line, located north of Brentwood, in the Westside Region of Los Angeles, links a freeway-level parking garage to the Getty Center, which includes the J. Paul Getty Museum. The duration of a ride is about 3 to 4 minutes.

The lower station, at the bottom of the hill, lies beside Sepulveda Boulevard and the San Diego Freeway and features a refuge siding. The upper station, at the top of the hill, is located in the arrival plaza of the Getty Center and is part of the structure. The line follows Getty Center Drive and has a passing loop in the middle, although the two trains can operate independently.

Gallery

See also 
Los Angeles County Metropolitan Transportation Authority

References

External links 

Public transportation in Los Angeles
People mover systems in the United States
Hovair people movers
J. Paul Getty Museum
Brentwood, Los Angeles
Sepulveda Boulevard
Railway lines opened in 1997